The following is a list of episodes from the American animated children's television series, Wonder Pets!. It debuted on March 3, 2006, as part of the Nick Jr. block on the Nickelodeon cable television network.

Series overview

Episodes

Season 1 (2006–2007)

Season 2 (2007–2009)

Season 3 (2009–2013)

Footnotes

Lists of American children's animated television series episodes
Lists of Nickelodeon television series episodes